Stanley Prager (January 8, 1917 – January 18, 1972) was an American actor and a television and theatre director.

Life and career

Born in New York City, Prager began his career as the stage manager for the Broadway production The Skin of Our Teeth in 1942. He spent the remainder of the decade acting in mostly B-movies, with occasional roles in better films such as A Bell for Adano, Gun Crazy, In the Meantime, Darling, and A Foreign Affair.

After his name appeared on the Hollywood blacklist, Prager returned to Broadway as a performer in Two on the Aisle, Two's Company, Room Service, and The Pajama Game. He switched gears and began directing with Neil Simon's Come Blow Your Horn in 1961. Additional theatre directing credits include Bravo Giovanni, Minnie's Boys, Don't Drink the Water, and 70, Girls, 70.

Prager's television directing credits include The Love Song of Barney Kempinski for ABC Stage 67, Car 54, Where Are You?, and The Patty Duke Show. For producer Sidney Pink, Prager directed two films in Europe: Madigan's Millions the first film to star Dustin Hoffman, and Bang Bang Kid starring Tom Bosley and Guy Madison.

Prager married actress Georgann Johnson on July 31, 1954; they remained together until his death on January 18, 1972. The couple had four children, including former teen actresses Anne and Sally Prager. 

Stanley Prager died of a heart attack at the family home in Los Angeles.

Filmography

External links

 
 

American theatre directors
American television directors
Male actors from New York City
1917 births
1972 deaths
20th-century American male actors
Hollywood blacklist